Nelson Ferreira Coelho (born 26 May 1982) is a retired Swiss and Portuguese footballer. He last played for FC Thun.

Career
He played for FC Thun from July 2001 until summer 2008. He joined FC Luzern in summer 2008. He played in the Champions League 2005/2006 Group Stage game against Arsenal FC at Highbury and scored the equalizer for FC Thun although the club lost the game 2–1 after Dennis Bergkamp scored an injury time winner.

In January 2011 Ferreira signed an extended contract to stay at Luzern until June 2014.

Ferreira retired at the end of the 2018-19 season.

External links
Profile at Welt Fussball

References

Portuguese footballers
Portuguese expatriate footballers
Portuguese expatriate sportspeople in Switzerland
Swiss men's footballers
Swiss people of Portuguese descent
FC Thun players
FC Luzern players
Swiss Super League players
1982 births
Living people
Place of birth missing (living people)
Association football midfielders
People from Interlaken
Sportspeople from the canton of Bern